Sparbu is a former municipality in the old Nord-Trøndelag county, Norway. The  municipality existed from 1838 until its dissolution in 1964. It encompassed the southwestern part of what is now the municipality of Steinkjer, south of the town of Steinkjer, east of the Børgin bay off the Trondheimsfjorden, and southwest of the Ogndalen valley. The administrative centre was the village of Sparbu.

History

The parish of Sparbu was established as a municipality on 1 January 1838 (see formannskapsdistrikt law). The eastern Ogndalen valley (population: 1,441) was separated from Sparbu on 1 January 1885 to form the new municipality of Skei. This left Sparbu with 2,842 residents. During the 1960s, there were many municipal mergers across Norway due to the work of the Schei Committee. On 1 January 1964, a large merger took place: the neighboring municipalities of Beitstad (population: 2,563), Egge (population: 3,476), Kvam (population: 1,245), Ogndal (population: 2,678), Sparbu (population: 4,027), and Stod (population: 1,268) were all merged with the town of Steinkjer (population: 4,325) to form the new municipality of Steinkjer.

Name
The municipality (originally the parish) is named an old name for the area. Historically, the name was spelled Sparbuen (using the definite singular form).

Government
While it existed, this municipality was responsible for primary education (through 10th grade), outpatient health services, senior citizen services, unemployment, social services, zoning, economic development, and municipal roads. During its existence, this municipality was governed by a municipal council of elected representatives, which in turn elected a mayor.

Mayors
The mayors of Sparbu:

 1837–1836 Johan Christian Schiefloe
 1840–1843 Andreas Erlandsen
 1844–1845 Lars Smith
 1846–1849 Andreas Erlandsen
 1850–1851 Erik Dalum
 1852–1857 Johan Nøst
 1858–1861 Erik Dalum
 1862–1869 Johan Petter Brandsegg
 1870–1871 Andreas Schult
 1872–1877 Johan Petter Brandsegg
 1878–1889 Peter O. Skjeflo (V)
 1890–1891 Lornts G. Strugstad
 1892–1893 Jakob Oksur
 1894–1895 Johan Kr. Braset
 1896–1898 Hilmar Lønnum
 1899–1900 Johannes Bragstad (V)
 1900–1901 Ole M. Eid (V)
 1902–1904 Johannes Okkehaug (V)
 1905–1907 Bertinus Rannem (H)
 1908–1910 Johannes Okkehaug (V)
 1911–1913 Bertinus Rannem (H)
 1914–1916 Johannes Okkehaug (V)
 1917–1919 Peer M. Schiefloe (Ap)
 1920–1922 John Tanem (V)
 1923-1923 Bertinus Rannem (H)
 1923–1925 Per Lein (Bp)
 1926–1928 Fridtjof Rannem (Bp)
 1929–1931 Eystein Utheim (Bp)
 1932–1934 Fridtjof Rannem (Bp)
 1935-1935 Hans Ystgaard (Ap)
 1935–1937 Ole K. Nordgård (Ap)
 1938–1940 Eystein Utheim (Bp)
 1945-1945 Fridtjof Rannem (Bp)
 1945-1945 Erling Moen (Bp)
 1946–1947 Hans Ystgaard (Ap)
 1948–1959 Harald Nordberg (Ap)
 1960–1963 Karl Tørhaug (Ap)

Municipal council
The municipal council  of Sparbu was made up of representatives that were elected to four year terms. The party breakdown of the final municipal council was as follows:

See also
List of former municipalities of Norway

References

Steinkjer
Former municipalities of Norway
1838 establishments in Norway
1964 disestablishments in Norway